The 2002 Atlantic 10 men's basketball tournament was played from March 6 to March 9, 2002. The tournament was played at The Spectrum in Philadelphia, Pennsylvania.  The winner was named champion of the Atlantic 10 Conference and received an automatic bid to the 2002 NCAA Men's Division I Basketball Tournament. Xavier University won the tournament and got the conference's only bid to the NCAA Tournament. Dayton, Richmond, Temple, Saint Joseph's and St. Bonaventure received bids to the 2002 National Invitation Tournament. David West of Xavier was named the tournament's Most Outstanding Player. Future NBA players Rasual Butler of La Salle and Romain Sato and Lionel Chalmers, both of Xavier, were among those joining West on the All-Championship Team.

Format
The tournament was a single-elimination tournament. Seeding was determined by the regular season standings in each division. With the conference divided into East and West divisions, the top two teams in each division received a first-round bye. This was after a one-year departure from this format due to having only eleven teams in the conference the year before.

Bracket

All games played at The Spectrum, Philadelphia, Pennsylvania* - Overtime

References
 Atlantic 10 Championship Results

Atlantic 10 men's basketball tournament
Tournament
Atlantic 10 men's basketball tournament
Atlantic 10 men's basketball tournament